Latas is a surname, found in many countries in Europe, mainly in Serbia, Poland, Croatia, but also Spain and Portugal from Middle Ages. However their mutual geographical and lexical origin is undetermined.

Slavic surname

This surname in the countries of ex-Yugoslavia is not tied to any ethnicity or confession, yet territory (Dinara). Croatian linguist, Petar Šimunović, derived Lat from personal name Láto (Latif), meaning gentle. The second part as is ending suffix, mostly found in personal names among Vlach pastoralist communities from Dinara.

List of people with surname Latas
Omar Pasha, born Mihajlo Latas (1806–1871), Ottoman general and governor.
Branko Latas Vrška, Serbian political scientist, historian and colonel in the Yugoslav People's Army.
Dragan Pavloviḱ Latas, Macedonian journalist.

See also
Latas (Aragonese dynasty) for the noble Spanish surname.

References

Croatian surnames
Serbian surnames